Baron Calverley, of the City of Bradford in the West Riding of the County of York, is a title in the Peerage of the United Kingdom. It was created in 1945 for the Labour politician George Muff. He had previously represented Kingston upon Hull East in the House of Commons.  the title is held by his grandson, the third Baron, who succeeded his father in 1971.

Barons Calverley (1945)
George Muff, 1st Baron Calverley (1877–1955)
George Raymond Orford Muff, 2nd Baron Calverley (1914–1971)
Charles Rodney Muff, 3rd Baron Calverley (b. 1946)

The heir apparent is the present holder's son the Hon. Jonathan Edward Muff (b. 1975)

Notes

References
Kidd, Charles, Williamson, David (editors). Debrett's Peerage and Baronetage (1990 edition). New York: St Martin's Press, 1990, 

Baronies in the Peerage of the United Kingdom
Noble titles created in 1945
Noble titles created for UK MPs